Mashkel (ماشکید ) is a tehsil in Washuk District, Balochistan, Pakistan. It is the biggest Tehsil of District Washuk and lies on the border between Iran and Pakistan.

According to the census of Pakistan, Mashkhel has a population of around 70,000. It is known for its date tree and deserts.

See also 
 Qila Ladgasht
 Washuk District

References 

Tehsils of Balochistan, Pakistan